The Singing Ringing Tree is a wind powered sound sculpture resembling a tree set in the landscape of the Pennine hill range overlooking Burnley, in Lancashire, England.

Completed in 2006, it is part of the series of four sculptures within the Panopticons arts and regeneration project created by the East Lancashire Environmental Arts Network (ELEAN). The project was set up to erect a series of 21st-century landmarks, or Panopticons (structures providing a comprehensive view), across East Lancashire as symbols of the renaissance of the area.

Some of the pipes are primarily structural and visual elements, while others have been cut across their width enabling the sound. The harmonic and singing qualities of the tree were produced by tuning the pipes according to their length by adding holes to the underside of each.

In 2007, the sculpture won (along with 13 other candidates) the National Award of the Royal Institute of British Architects (RIBA) for architectural excellence.

In March 2017, a second Singing Ringing Tree was set on the outskirts of Austin, Texas in the United States in the rural area of a small town called Manor.

While the exact location is unknown, Tonkin Liu also helped in the creation of a third sculpture which is found somewhere in Saudi Arabia. 

The "Singing Ringing Tree" sculpture was donated to the City of Abilene in July 2022 by its owner in the Austin, Texas, area. The anonymous donor covered the installation and moving costs, which were arranged by the Abilene Cultural Affairs Council. The council contracted with JK Welding to dismantle and reassemble the sculpture, which is composed of nearly 27 tons of pipes, east of the Frontier Texas! museum in the grassy median where Treadaway Boulevard splits and flows into South 1st St. The sculpture's position has been optimized to maximize the wind blowing across the pipes, creating a melodious and choral humming sound that can be heard from 100-400 feet away, depending on wind speeds.

See also
Sibelius Monument Helsinki
Blackpool High Tide Organ
Halo (artwork)
Aeolus Acoustic Wind Pavilion

References

Birch, Amanda (3 August 2007), "Tonkin Liu’s Singing Ringing Tree puts panpipes into park panorama", in Building Design (bdonline.co.uk). Retrieved 5 June 2008.
 East Lancashire Environmental Arts Network (2005), 
 Royal Institute of British Architects (RIBA) (22 June 2007), RIBA National and European Awards. Retrieved 5 June 2008.
 Carlson, Amanda (9 September 2020), "The rise of Houston jack-of-all-trades shop JK Welding", in The Welder. Retrieved 1 July 2021.
FOX West Texas TV station. (July 12, 2022). "Rare Singing Ringing Tree Sculpture Set to Find New Home in Abilene." [Source]
Abilene Reporter-News. (July 22, 2022). "Abilene's in for a 'Treet': Singing Ringing Sculpture Installation." [Source].

External links
Sound and video on Sound Tourism site
YouTube videos

Sound sculptures
Wind-activated musical instruments
Outdoor sculptures in England
Buildings and structures in Burnley
2006 sculptures
Steel sculptures in England
2006 establishments in England